Otto Oswald Lee (born July 29, 1967) is a Hong Kong-born American politician, attorney, and military veteran who was a Sunnyvale, California city council member from 2003 to 2011, before which he was on the Planning Commission, which he chaired from 2000 to 2001. From 2005 to 2006 he was vice mayor, and from 2006 to 2007 he was the 57th mayor of Sunnyvale. He is a patent attorney, and a co-founder and partner of the Intellectual Property Law Group LLP.

Prior to becoming a lawyer, Lee served in the U.S. Navy as a supply corps officer. He was a commander in the United States Naval Reserve and the executive officer of a Naval Aircraft Carriers Reserve unit based in San Diego.

Early life and education
Lee was born in Hong Kong, then a British colony, in 1967. He moved to the U.S. state of California at age 15. He received a B.S. in chemical engineering and nuclear engineering from the University of California, Berkeley, a J.D. from the University of California, Hastings College of the Law, and an LL.M. in Public International Law from Leiden University in The Netherlands.

Military career
Lee joined the United States Navy in 1989 as an ensign. After this initial active duty he continued to serve in the Navy Reserve, recalled to active duty for Operation Noble Eagle in 2003 and again in 2009 for Operation Iraqi Freedom. Lee also supported the defense of the Republic of Korea under the Commander Naval Forces Korea. Most recently holding the rank of commander, Lee retired from the  Navy in 2018.

Political campaigns

2008 Santa Clara County Board of Supervisors election
In 2008 he qualified in the June primary to compete to represent District 3 on the Santa Clara County Board of Supervisors, but lost to David Cortese in the November general election, receiving 45.2% of votes cast to Cortese's 55.8%. of the votes

2012 U.S. House of Representatives election

On March 27, 2012, Lee announced his candidacy for California's 22nd Congressional District seat to challenge incumbent Representative Devin Nunes, Republican of Tulare. This district covers areas of Fresno and Tulare counties, both located in California's San Joaquin Valley.

Lee and Nunes were the only candidates in the June 6 nonpartisan primary, in which Lee placed second with 30.1 percent to Nunes's 69.9 percent. On November 6, Nunes won the general election with 132,386 votes (61.9 percent) to Lee's 81,555 votes (38.1 percent).

2020 Santa Clara County Board of Supervisors election
In 2020, Lee was among four candidates for the open District 3 seat of the Santa Clara County Board of Supervisors to replace the termed-out Dave Cortese. In the March 3, 2020 top-two primary election, Lee finished in second place with 29 percent of the vote behind Kansen Chu, who had 31.5 percent. of the vote

Santa Clara County Board of Supervisors

At the March 23, 2021 Board of Supervisors meeting, Lee made recommendations relating to a work plan and timeline regarding the implementation of an anti-hate community outreach and education campaign in response to the recent spike of Anti-Asian hate crimes and violence.

At the April 20, 2021 Board of Supervisors meeting, Lee brought forth a proposal to have the County review legislative proposals and how they may impact immigrants locally, including HR 6, HR 1603, and HR 1177. U.S. Senator Alex Padilla’s Citizenship for Essential Workers Act (S 747) was included as part of the staff’s review and analysis of federal legislative proposals relating to immigration. The Board of Supervisors unanimously passed Supervisor Lee's referral.

In 2021, Lee created the D3 URJGENT (Unhoused, Racial Justice, Green, Equity, Neighborhoods & Transparency) Grant Program, which is open to registered 501(c)3 non-profit entities or organizations with 501(c)3 fiscal agents that provide services in Santa Clara County.

In April 2022, Supervisor Lee decided to forgo his vacation so that he could volunteer in Poland. Lee spent for days and three nights distributing food and other vital supplies to Ukrainian refugees fleeing to Poland following the 2022 Russian invasion of Ukraine. 

In May 2022, Lee, Santa Clara County District Attorney Jeff Rosen and local law enforcement agencies held a hugely successful gun buyback event. The event captured over 400 firearms previously on Santa Clara County streets.

In October 2022, Lee hosted the annual Day on the Bay celebration in Alviso Marina, the event offered the public access to vital community resources along with prizes and food. The event also featured a significant public health component, resulting in over 139 Covid-19 booster shots and 220 flu vaccines being administered.

References

Living people
Hong Kong emigrants to the United States
Leiden University alumni
Mayors of places in California
American patent attorneys
United States Navy officers
UC Berkeley College of Engineering alumni
University of California, Hastings College of the Law alumni
1967 births
People from Sunnyvale, California
Democratic Party San Francisco Bay Area politicians
Military personnel from California
Asian-American city council members